Savvides is a surname. Notable people with the surname include: 

George Savvides (born 1956), Australian businessman
George L. Savvides (born 1959), Cypriot politician and lawyer
Georgette Savvides (born 1973), Greek Egyptian psychologist

Greek-language surnames